Martin Mirchevski (born 11 February 1997) is a Macedonian professional footballer who plays as a right wing and attacking midfielder for FK TSC Bačka Topola in the Serbian SuperLiga.

Career

Club
Mirchevski made his senior football debut on 24 November 2013 at the age of 16, by entering the game in the stoppage time for Pelister against Metalurg in the 16th round of the 2013–14 Macedonian First Football League season. That season he went on to play 4 games, one of which he played as a starter and three were appearances as a substitute.

International
On 20 November 2022, Mirchevski made his debut for North Macedonia's national team in a friendly match against Azerbaijan by entering the game in the 83rd minute.

References

External links
 
 

1997 births
Living people
Sportspeople from Bitola
Association football wingers
Macedonian footballers
Macedonian expatriate footballers
Expatriate footballers in Serbia
North Macedonia youth international footballers
North Macedonia international footballers
FK Pelister players
FK Vardar players
Akademija Pandev players
FK TSC Bačka Topola players
Macedonian First Football League players
Serbian SuperLiga players